Věžky may refer to places in the Czech Republic:

Věžky (Kroměříž District), a municipality and village
Věžky (Přerov District), a municipality and village